Qantara (قنطرة ) is a village in the Marjeyoun District in southern Lebanon.

Name
According to E. H. Palmer, the name El Kantarah means "the arch", qantara also being used in Arabic to denote a bridge built of stone or masonry, an aqueduct or a dam, and a high building.

History
In 1875 Victor Guérin found that the village had 150 Metawileh inhabitants. He further remarked: "The mosque is built of hewn stones of apparent antiquity. Its door is surmounted by a lintel belonging to an ancient Christian church, in the midst of which can be made out a cross with equal branches enclosed in a circle."

In 1881, the PEF's Survey of Western Palestine (SWP) described it: "A village, built of stone, containing about 250 [..] Metawileh, situated on an isolated and conspicuous hill, and surrounded by gardens, olives, and figs. There are two perennial springs a little to the south of the village."

On 24 August 1994 two members of Hizbollah were killed in Qantara in clashes with the South Lebanon Army.

References

Bibliography

External links
Qantara (Marjaayoun), Localiban
Survey of Western Palestine, Map 2:  IAA, Wikimedia commons

Populated places in Marjeyoun District
Shia Muslim communities in Lebanon